Central Plains Media is a television broadcasting company based in Sioux Falls, South Dakota. It is a subsidiary of the Guaranteed Impressions Group (G.I.G.).

Its television stations include:

 KCPO-LP channel 26, Sioux Falls, South Dakota (independent)
 KCPM channel 27, Grand Forks, North Dakota (MyNetworkTV)

Television broadcasting companies of the United States
Companies based in Sioux Falls, South Dakota